Cyrtosperma is a genus of flowering plants in the family Araceae. The genus went through considerable taxonomic changes in the 1980s, and as a result is now considered to be native only to Southeast Asia and some Pacific islands. Previously, the genus was believed to be widespread from Asia to Africa and South America, but the African and South American species were subsequently moved into separate genera. Cyrtosperma is now known to be most prominent in New Guinea. The genus Cyrtosperma is unique in this regards because it is the only known big genus in Araceae that is known to be found east of Wallace's line.

Cyrtosperma merkusii, or pulaka, is grown as a root crop in Oceania.

Species
Cyrtosperma beccarianum A.Hay - New Guinea
Cyrtosperma bougainvillense A.Hay - Solomon Islands
Cyrtosperma brassii A.Hay - Louisiade Archipelago
Cyrtosperma carrii A.Hay - Papua New Guinea
Cyrtosperma cuspidispathum Alderw. - New Guinea
Cyrtosperma giganteum Engl. - New Guinea
Cyrtosperma gressittiorum A.Hay - Louisiade Archipelago
Cyrtosperma hambalii A.Dearden & A.Hay - Western New Guinea
Cyrtosperma johnstonii (N.E.Br.) N.E.Br. - Solomon Islands
Cyrtosperma kokodense A.Hay - Papua New Guinea
Cyrtosperma macrotum Becc. ex Engl. - New Guinea
Cyrtosperma merkusii (Hassk.) Schott - New Guinea, Solomon Islands, Borneo, Java, Sumatra, Philippines, Fiji, Samoa, Kiribati, Santa Cruz Islands, Cook Islands, Marquesas, Caroline Islands, Mariana Islands; naturalized on various other islands

References

Lasioideae
Araceae genera